Segundo Villadóniga (6 November 1915 – 26 October 2006) was a Uruguayan footballer who played as an attacking midfielder.

Honours

 Peñarol
 Uruguayan Primera División: 1935, 1936, 1937, 1949
  Palmeiras
 Campeonato Paulista: 1942, 1944

References

Uruguayan footballers
1915 births
2006 deaths
Peñarol players
CR Vasco da Gama players
Sociedade Esportiva Palmeiras players
Uruguay international footballers
Copa América-winning players
Association football midfielders